The TGV Atlantique (TGV-A) is a class of high-speed trains used in France by SNCF; they were built by Alstom between 1988 and 1992, and were the second generation of TGV trains, following on from the TGV Sud-Est.

105 bi-current sets, numbered 301-405, were built for the opening of the LGV Atlantique. Entry into service began in 1989. They weigh , and are made up of two power cars and ten carriages with a total of 485 seats.

From 2015 onwards, many of these units have been scrapped with only 28 still in service in 2022. Most of the remaining fleet have been refurbished and mainly see service on slower trains between Paris and Bordeaux that use only a portion of the LGV Atlantique and LGV Sud Europe Atlantique. Fast through services on the route are now operated by the higher capacity TGV "Océane".

Modified unit 325 set the world speed record in 1990 on the new LGV before its opening. The set was reduced to two power cars and three carriages to improve the power-to-weight ratio, weighing .

Fleet details

See also
List of high speed trains
AVE Class 100, a high-speed train in Spain based on the design of the TGV Atlantique

Further reading

External links

Spec Sheet 

Land speed record rail vehicles
Atlantique
Electric multiple units with locomotive-like power cars
Passenger trains running at least at 300 km/h in commercial operations

25 kV AC multiple units
1500 V DC multiple units of France